s

Shirkhal is a big village in Ratnagiri district, Maharashtra state in Western India. The 2011 Census of India recorded a total of 1,086 residents in the village. Shirkhal is 825.68 hectares in size.

Shirkhal is big village in dapoli taluka. this village divided in to total  nine wadis 1) Gavawadi 2)Bhivjichiwadi 3)Boudhawadi 4)Sutarwadi 

5)Vadbhavunwadi 6) Adhiwashiwadi 8) Daghdhawne /Shirkhenagar 9) Wolvanwadi 

Shirkenagar located in Dapoli taluka § border of the mandangad § dapoli. Shirkenagar family is the word no 1 (head) of this village, manai devi Mandir is the biggest temple in Shirkenagar, Shirkhal.

Distance from Mumbai :207 km

Std code : 02358

References

Villages in Ratnagiri district